McGrail is a surname. Notable people with the surname include:

Ben McGrail (contemporary), British broadcast journalist
Chris McGrail (born 1989), English footballer
Edwina McGrail (born 1950), Welsh artist and poet
Joe McGrail (born 1964), American gridiron football player
John McGrail (born 1956), American long-distance runner
Nuala Anne McGrail, a protagonist in the Nuala Anne McGrail series of mystery novels by Father Andrew M. Greeley
Peter McGrail (born 1996), British boxer
Stephen McGrail (born 1948), American politician from Massachusetts
Walter McGrail (1888–1970), American film actor